Country Club/Main St is a station on the Metro light rail line in Mesa, Arizona, United States. The station is located one block east of the intersection of West Main Street and South Country Club Drive and opened on August 22, 2015.

Nearby landmarks
 Western end of downtown Mesa
 I.d.e.a. Museum
 Wilkes University, Mesa
 Mesa Center for Higher Education
 Mesa Police Headquarters

References

External links
 Valley Metro map

Valley Metro Rail stations
Transportation in Mesa, Arizona
Railway stations in the United States opened in 2015
Buildings and structures in Mesa, Arizona
2015 establishments in Arizona